Le due facce dell'amore is an Italian television series.

See also
List of Italian television series

External links
 

Italian television series
2010 Italian television series debuts
2010s Italian television series
Canale 5 original programming